The 2019–20 NBA G League season was the 19th season of the NBA G League, the official minor league basketball organization owned by the National Basketball Association (NBA). The season was suspended indefinitely on March 12, 2020, following the NBA's suspension due to the COVID-19 pandemic. The remainder of the season was cancelled on June 4.

League changes
The Atlanta Hawks' G League franchise that had been playing as the Erie BayHawks since 2017 relocated as planned to College Park, Georgia, following the completion of the Gateway Center Arena and were renamed the College Park Skyhawks. The New Orleans Pelicans then launched its own expansion team for the 2019–20 season that will operate another iteration of the Erie BayHawks, but plan to relocate their G League franchise to Birmingham, Alabama, at a renovated Legacy Arena by 2022.

The Maine Red Claws agreed to a sale to their parent team, the Boston Celtics, after having a hybrid affiliation with the Celtics since 2012.

Regular season
Final standings when the season was curtailed on March 12, 2020:

x – qualified for playoffs; y – Division champion; z – Conference champion

Eastern Conference

Atlantic Division

Central Division

Southeast Division

Western Conference

Midwest Division

Pacific Division

Southwest Division

Awards

Player of the Week

References

External links
Official website

 2019-20 season
Basketball events curtailed due to the COVID-19 pandemic